Punctelia cedrosensis is a species of foliose lichen in the family Parmeliaceae. It is endemic to Mexico, where it grows on the bark of conifers.

Taxonomy
The lichen was formally described as a new species in 2004 by lichenologists Robert Egan and John Alan Elix. Its range was later extended to northern Mexico (Nuevo León and Tamaulipas).

Description
Pseudocyphellae are rare; dense isidia occur on the thallus surface. The thallus undersurface ranges in colour from pale tan to light to medium brown. Rhizines are abundant, evenly distributed, and range in colour from light brown to brownish-black. The conidia are unciform (hook-like), measuring 4–6 by 1 μm. The cortex contains atranorin and chloroatranorin, while the medulla contains protoconstipatic, constipatic, dehydroconstipatic, and dehydroprotoconstipatic acids.

It is somewhat similar in appearance to the more common North American species Punctelia rudecta, but P. cedrosensis has much fewer pseudocyphellae, and does not produce lecanoric acid in its medulla.

References

cedrosensis
Lichen species
Lichens described in 2004
Lichens of Mexico
Taxa named by John Alan Elix
Taxa named by Robert Shaw Egan